The 28th Actors and Actresses Union Awards were held on 11 March 2019 at the Circo Price, in Madrid.
 
In addition to the competitive awards, Sandra Sabatés received the '' award, Marisa Paredes the '' career award and the Subcommittee for the Charter of the Artist the Special Award.

Winners and nominees 
The winners and nominees are listed as follows:

Film

Television

Theatre

Newcomers

International Production

References 

Actors and Actresses Union Awards
2019 in Madrid
2019 television awards
2019 film awards
2019 theatre awards
March 2019 events in Spain